The Royal Variety Performance is a televised variety show held annually in the United Kingdom to raise money for the Royal Variety Charity (of which King Charles III is life-patron). It is attended by senior members of the British royal family. The evening's performance is presented as a live variety show, usually from a theatre in London and consists of family entertainment that includes comedy, music, dance, magic and other speciality acts.

The Royal Variety Performance traditionally begins with the entrance of the members of the royal family followed by singing of the national anthem, God Save the King, which was also performed by the participating acts as a traditional end to Royal Variety Performances; with the exception of 2020 due to the coronavirus pandemic, as a result of which, As If We Never Said Goodbye opened that year's show instead, sung by that year's host, Jason Manford.

Background and founding
The first performance, on 1 July 1912, was called the Royal Command Performance, and this name has persisted informally for the event. This was held in the Palace Theatre, Shaftesbury Avenue, London, in the presence of King George V and Queen Mary. After correspondence with theatre impresario Sir Edward Moss, the King said he would command a Royal Variety show in his Coronation year, 1911, provided the profits went to the Variety Artistes' Benevolent Fund, as the Royal Variety Charity was then known. It was planned to be in the Empire Theatre, Edinburgh, part of the vast Moss Empires group, but the building caught on fire a month before the show. After the death of Moss, Sir Alfred Butt was chosen as the impresario and it was staged in 1912. This was a lavish occasion, and his London Palace Theatre was lavishly decorated, complete with some 3 million rose petals.

Artists and performers
Top performers included Vesta Tilley, Sir George Robey, David Devant, Anna Pavlova, Harry Lauder and Cecilia Loftus. The organisers did not invite Marie Lloyd, because of a professional dispute. Her act was deemed too risqué and her three public, unsuccessful marriages were thought to make her unfit to perform in front of royalty. She held a rival performance in a nearby theatre, which she advertised was "by command of the British public". The name of the event was changed to prevent possible royal embarrassment. The Royal Variety Performance became an annual event at the suggestion of King George V from 1921 and from 1927 the British Broadcasting Corporation began to broadcast it on radio.

From 1928 through to 1938, the impresario-producer and manager of the London Palladium, George Black, took over the presentation of the Royal Variety Performance. He would also facilitate as compere at the shows. His first production was held on 1 March 1928 at the London Coliseum and from 1930 to 1937 he held the shows at the London Palladium. His 1938 show returned to the London Coliseum. Throughout World War II from 1939 to 1944 no shows were presented. The show resumed in 1945 after the war ended.

From 1960 to 2010, the BBC and ITV broadcast a recorded version of the show, alternating the production between their two main channels, with the BBC producing and televising the 'even years' and ITV televising the 'odd years'. In both 1976 and 1978, the BBC broadcast the show live. The show was staged mainly in a West End theatre. Prior to 1999, only two shows were staged outside London (1955 in Blackpool and 1959 in Manchester), but since becoming the exclusive broadcaster, ITV has staged the show in regional theatres outside London. From 2011, ITV have exclusive rights to televise the show. The show has been frequently staged in the London Palladium theatre, and in the 1950s and 1960s a television show based on the same idea, called Sunday Night at the London Palladium and hosted by many entertainers, including Bruce Forsyth, ran for over 20 years.

A wide range of acts has performed at the Royal Variety Performance, including Laurel and Hardy in 1947, the Beatles in 1963, the Supremes in 1968 and the Blue Man Group in 2005. Max Bygraves and Cliff Richard are two of the most frequent performers, having appeared at least 14 and 13 times each respectively between 1950 and 2008. The Beatles appeared at the 1963 show, when John Lennon delivered the famous line:

The money raised by the Royal Variety Performance provides most of the funding for the Royal Variety Charity (formerly the Entertainment Artistes' Benevolent Fund) and its care-home for retired members of the entertainment profession and their dependents, Brinsworth House.

In 1974, Noele Gordon presented the Royal Variety Performance making her the first female presenter of the show.

Performances

After the first Royal Variety Performance on 1 July 1912 presented by Sir Alfred Butt, it was seven years before the next show, on 28 July 1919 held at the Coliseum Theatre presented this time by Sir Oswald Stoll. The orchestra was conducted by Edward Elgar. In 1921 it moved to the Hippodrome, and was held in November. It was the first time that the Royal Variety Performance became an annual event. In 1923 it moved to the Coliseum Theatre. Then after a gap in 1924, moved to the Alhambra Theatre in February 1925, where it remained in 1926, held on 27 May. It was the first Royal Variety Performance to be broadcast, with the BBC providing live radio coverage.

In 1927 there was another move, this time to the Victoria Palace Theatre, with J. A. Webb the compère. The 1928 show, on 13 December, was held at the Coliseum Theatre. The next show, on 22 May 1930, moved to the London Palladium with George Black and Val Parnell compèring. It was the start of seven successive years at the venue.

In 1935 the Royal Variety Performance was held in the Silver Jubilee year of King George V and Queen Mary. This was the last time King George V attended – he died three months later, in January 1936.

There have been two Royal Scottish Variety Performances, both attended by Queen Elizabeth II, and presented by Howard & Wyndham Ltd in Glasgow's Alhambra Theatre, which Sir Alfred Butt had opened, in 1958 and 1963. The Children's Royal Variety Performance was devised by entertainer Rod Hull in 1981 and took place in London until 1994 in aid of NSPCC.

In 1990, A Royal Birthday Gala to celebrate the 90th birthday of Queen Elizabeth The Queen Mother, was staged at the London Palladium on 19 July, replacing the traditional November/December Royal Variety Show that year. In place of the traditional show, a special programme called Thirty Years of the Royal Variety Performance aired on BBC One on 29 December 1990. It was hosted by Bruce Forsyth and took a look back at the BBC's television broadcasts of the programme over 30 years, with clips from the archives. After this variation, from 1991, the traditional variety show returned.

However in 2020, due to the coronavirus pandemic, a virtual version was held, opening with a virtual message from the then Prince of Wales followed by "As If We Never Said Goodbye" sung by that year's host Jason Manford.

Britain's Got Talent

Since 2007, one act of the Royal Variety show has been selected by the British public through the ITV television talent show Britain's Got Talent.

A public telephone vote decides the most popular act in each semi-final, which then progresses to the final, along with a second act chosen by the judges. The grand final is then broadcast live and all the acts perform again for the public vote.

Winners

 2007: Paul Potts – pop opera tenor
 2008: George Sampson – street dancer
 2009: Diversity – street dance group
 2010: Spelbound – gymnastics squad
 2011: Jai McDowall – singer
 2012: Ashleigh and Pudsey – musical canine freestyle
 2013: Attraction – shadow theatre group
 2014: Collabro – singing group
 2015: Jules O'Dwyer & Matisse – musical canine freestyle
 2016: Richard Jones – magician
 2017: Tokio Myers – pianist
 2018: Lee Ridley (Lost Voice Guy) – comedian
 2019: Colin Thackery – singer
 2020: Jon Courtenay – comical singer and pianist
 2022: Axel Blake – comedian

Venues

There have been a total of 17 theatres that have staged the 93 Royal Variety Performances, and the 1912 Royal Command Performance. Out of the total of 93 shows, 75 have been in London theatres and seven in other cities and towns.

Note: Where no town or city is noted in the theatre column in the following table, the venue is situated in London.

Royal Family attendance
A total of 17 members of the royal family have attended the 86 Royal Variety Performances, and the 1912 Royal Command Performance.

Television coverage
The performance is broadcast on television throughout the world and is considered by many to be a tradition of the Christmas and New Year holiday season, particularly within the 53 countries of the British Commonwealth. For example, in Norway the programme is broadcast on NRK following the chimes of midnight each New Year's Eve with Norwegian subtitles and in New Zealand, Australia, South Africa, the Caribbean Islands and the Bahamas it is broadcast during the afternoon of Christmas Day, every year. In Canada, it has aired on CBC variously on Boxing Day, New Year's Eve or New Year's Day.

ITV is contracted by the Royal Variety Charity for TV production and in the UK is the sole broadcaster, having shared that responsibility with the BBC between 1960 and 2010.

Ratings 
In the 1960s, the televised edition of the show was the number one rated show for the entire year in the UK in 1960, 1961, 1962, 1963, 1965, 1967 and 1968, with the show ranked 6th in 1964, 3rd in 1966 and 2nd in 1969.

In the 1970s, the show topped the annual rankings in 1975 and ranked 8th in 1970, 4th in 1971, 9th in 1976 and 3rd in 1977.

Ratings sourced from BARB. 

Notes:
 6.75 million on ITV, 564,000 on ITV HD and 293,000 on ITV +1.
 8.05 million on ITV, 767,000 on ITV HD and 422,000 on ITV +1.
 7.07 million on ITV, 832,000 on ITV HD and 398,000 on ITV +1.
 6.31 million on ITV, 919,000 on ITV HD and 413,000 on ITV +1.

See also
Royal Command Performance

References

Further reading

External links 
 
 History of the Royal Variety Performance

Recurring events established in 1912
1912 establishments in the United Kingdom
British royal family
ITV (TV network) original programming
BBC Television shows
British variety television shows
Annual events in the United Kingdom
Music festivals in London